Anne-Marie Bauduin (born 6 May 1972) is a French former gymnast. She competed in five events at the 1988 Summer Olympics.

References

External links
 

1972 births
Living people
French female artistic gymnasts
Olympic gymnasts of France
Gymnasts at the 1988 Summer Olympics
People from Saint-Lô
Sportspeople from Manche
20th-century French women